The Minister for Natural Resources was a ministry in New South Wales responsible for land, waterways, reserves and parks and forestry. It was established in 1987 and abolished in 2015.

History
The minister was responsible for the former portfolios of Lands, Water Resources and Forests. It was abolished in 2007 and replaced with the portfolio of Climate Change, Environment and Water . It was re-created in the first Baird ministry, and was abolished in the Second Baird ministry, replaced by the portfolio of Lands and Water.

List of Ministers for Natural Resources

Assistant ministers

References

Natural Resources